Comostola ocellulata is a moth of the  family Geometridae. It is found in Taiwan.

References

Moths described in 1920
Hemitheini
Moths of Taiwan